Herminia Silva Leite Guerreiro GCIH (23 October 1907 - 13 June 1993) was a Portuguese fado singer.

Life 
Silva was born at Hospital de Sao Jose to Josefina Augusta. At the age of 10, she began singing while she worked as a seamstress. Her career spanned seventy years.

Honors 

 Commander of the Order of Prince Henry (24 August 1985)
 Grand Cross of the Order of Prince Henry (10 June 1990)

References

External links 
Herminia Silva on IMDb

1907 births
1993 deaths
20th-century Portuguese women singers
Portuguese fado singers
Portuguese actresses
Commanders of the Order of Prince Henry
Grand Crosses of the Order of Prince Henry